The Calling may refer to:

Art
 The Calling (McCann sculpture), a 2003 outdoor sculpture in Belfast
 The Calling (di Suvero), a 1982 public artwork by American artist Mark di Suvero

Books
 The Calling, a novel by Kelley Armstrong
 Luther: The Calling, a 2011 novel by Neil Cross
 The Calling, a novel by David Gaider 2011 
 The Calling, a novel by Inger Ash Wolfe 2000
 The Calling, a book by Blair Grubb 2010
 The Calling, a novel by Rachelle Dekker 2016

Film and TV
 The Calling (2000 film), a 2000 horror film with Laura Harris, Richard Lintern, Francis Magee
 The Calling (2002 film), a 2000 film about televangelist Leroy Jenkins directed by Damian Chapa
 The Calling (2009 film), a 2009 British drama film with Emily Beecham 
 The Calling (2014 film), a 2014 Canadian thriller film with Susan Sarandon
 The Calling (TV series), a 2022 American crime drama series

Music
 The Calling (band), an American alternative rock band

Albums
 The Calling (Aquarium Rescue Unit album), 2003
 The Calling (Hilltop Hoods album), 2003
 The Calling (Mary Chapin Carpenter album), 2007
The Calling (Meav album), a 2013 album by Méav Ní Mhaolchatha
 The Calling: Celebrating Sarah Vaughan, 2001 album by Dianne Reeves

Songs
 "The Calling" (song), a 1994 song by Yes
 "The Calling", a song by Gothminister, from the album Empire of Dark Salvation
 "The Calling", a song by Northlane, from the album Singularity
 "The Calling", a song by Santana, from the album Supernatural
 "The Calling", a song by TheFatRat
 "The Calling", a song by The Killers, from the album Wonderful Wonderful

Other
 Calling (video game), a survival horror video game

See also 
 Calling (disambiguation)
 The Calling of St Matthew, a painting by Caravaggio